Alan Thomas Ranken Hellaby (11 November 1958 – 20 July 2009) was a New Zealand cricketer. He played 26 first-class and 24 List A matches for Auckland between 1979 and 1988.

Hellaby died on 20 July 2009.

See also
 List of Auckland representative cricketers

References

1958 births
2009 deaths
New Zealand cricketers
Auckland cricketers
Cricketers from Auckland